The Day of the Triffids is a drama made in 2009. It is a loose adaptation of John Wyndham's 1951 novel of the same title. The novel had previously been adapted in 1962 as a theatrical film and by the BBC in a 1981 series.

Plot

Part one
Triffids are large carnivorous plants capable of vicious and intelligent behaviour and equipped with venomous stingers that they use to stun their prey before feeding on them. In the late 1970s in the jungles of Zaire, a woman is killed by a Triffid. In 2009, Bill Masen (Dougray Scott), the son of the woman killed, is a Triffid expert and tells the story of how the oils the Triffids produce came to be used as a new alternative fuel, putting an end to man-made global warming. Triffids are kept in warehouses in countries worldwide. Some protest the treatment of the plants. One of these activists (Ewen Bremner) breaks into a compound for male Triffids outside London and is arrested.

Bill is injured by an undeveloped plant in the attempt, having given his safety goggles to another worker, Lucy (Nora-Jane Noone), a security officer and friend of Bill. Lucy rushes him to a local hospital, where he is told that he has a 50–50 chance of going blind permanently. With his eyes covered in bandages, he misses a massive solar eruption which occurs that same night, the bright light of which is seen all over the world. The rays prove to be more dangerous than first thought, as they suddenly intensify to a horrific brilliance and all those who see the flares are blinded—more than 95 per cent of the world's population.

An aircraft heading toward the capital is brought down when the solar storm blinds the pilots and all but one of the passengers on board. The sole sighted man (Eddie Izzard) clambers into the toilet, covers himself in life vests, and braces for the worst. The plane eventually crashes and the man, narrowly escaping death, takes the name Torrence, after the destroyed Westminster road. Back at the hospital, Bill has finally regained his sight but has no idea of how the world has changed overnight. Chaos reigns in the streets, with many of the blind now struggling to find their way. Bill finds Radio Britain personality Jo Playton (Joely Richardson) being ambushed by a throng of desperate blind citizens who have realised that she can see and are trying to use her as a guide. Bill saves her from further harm.

Jo was in the London Underground at the time of the solar flare and was not blinded. The pair team up to find out what has happened but Bill's only concern is the Triffids, knowing that the catastrophe must have caused the electricity at the compounds, the only thing keeping the populace safe, to fail. Bill and Jo soon spot a signal from a university tower, a message to sighted people. Upon arrival, they find that a group of surviving members of the civil service and armed forces has been assembled to continue the human race as best it can. Bill is angered by how little warning there is of the encroaching Triffids. He attempts to escape but is captured by Coker (Jason Priestley), who uses him to round up survivors and supplies for the cause, oblivious to the disaster that is about to unfold.

Part two
Bill and Coker are nearly killed during a late-night ambush by a group of Triffids. Fearing the worst is yet to come they both travel on foot to a new religious colony run by Durrant (Vanessa Redgrave), now the Mother Superior. Despite its secluded location, Bill is aware that the Triffids may return, and worse, could reproduce faster thanks to a cluster of beehives. Bill decides to leave for Shirning, hoping to find his estranged father Dennis Masen (Brian Cox) and with it a solution to stop the Triffids. Outside the church he finds the body of Father Thomas, sacrificed by Durrant to the Triffids. He returns in anger, surprising Durrant, who leaves the colony, insisting that the society will collapse without her. Several days follow and Bill has continued to journey towards his father's house. During the journey, he meets two orphaned but sighted girls Imogen (Julia Joyce) and Susan (Jenn Murray), who almost kill him with potshots in the process. The three journey to Shirning but are ambushed by a mysterious figure, who reveals himself as Dennis Masen. Upon returning to Shirning House, protected from Triffid attacks by a powerful electric fence, Bill is re-united with Jo, who narrowly escaped Torrence's men the night before. Dennis reveals to Bill his plan to stop the Triffids, intending to genetically engineer a new species to neutralise the old one. Though Bill finds the idea absurd, he nonetheless agrees to retrieve the last part of the experiment, a male Triffid head.

Finding the head during a daring break into an abandoned plantation, the new Triffid proves to be a success but at the same time Coker drops some papers off at the house, which explains the details of a new colony on the Isle of Wight, where the last of the Triffids were exterminated. Dennis' examination of his wife's Triffid recordings from Zaire causes the growing Triffid to react, attacking him with its stinger. Bill hears Dennis' cry for help and attempts to free his father, firing at the Triffid through its head. With Dennis dead and the subject destroyed, the group has no option but to leave for the Isle of Wight. Before they can leave, Torrence turns up at the house with a group of men, looking for the solution to the Triffids but Bill refuses to tell him the plan. Torrence threatens to kill him, Jo and the girls if he doesn't find a new plan by the next morning. Bill plans an escape, using the same recordings that killed his father earlier to draw in more Triffids to cause a distraction. Their plans are nearly thwarted by one of the soldiers, a rookie cadet named Troy (Troy Glasgow), who defects to them by faking their deaths to Torrence. The inactive fence is destroyed by the Triffid swarm, trapping everybody in the house and grounds but one of the girls picks up an old folk mask from Bill's old things, causing him to remember something from 30 years previous. He was told on that day by a man that the mask would help him to see by being temporarily blinded by Triffid poison. Realising that this is the solution they've been looking for, he administers the treatment to himself, Jo, Troy, Susan and Imogen. It allows them to pass through the Triffids unharmed but Torrence and his remaining forces are eventually overwhelmed by them and killed.

The family is next seen on the Isle of Wight after settling into the colony. With the group protected from the Triffids by the Solent, Bill still wonders about eventually returning to the mainland and questions the moral of how the world was blind even when our eyes were open.

Cast 
Dougray Scott as Bill Masen
 Joely Richardson as Jo Playton
 Jason Priestly as Coker
 Eddie Izzard as Torrence
 Brian Cox as Dennis Masen
 Vanessa Redgrave as Durrant
 Jenn Murray as Susan
 Julia Joyce as Imogen
 Lizzie Hopley as Hilda
 Troy Glasgow as Troy
 Ewen Bremner as Walter Strange
 Shane Taylor as Osman
 Adam Sinclair as Ashdown

Production notes
In November 2008, it was announced that the BBC had commissioned Power and Prodigy Pictures to produce a new version of the story; the drama was screened on 28 and 29 December 2009, starring Dougray Scott as Bill Masen, Joely Richardson as Jo Playton, Brian Cox as Dennis Masen, Vanessa Redgrave as Durrant, Eddie Izzard as Torrence, Jason Priestley as Coker, Jenn Murray as Susan, Ewen Bremner as Walter Strange, Shane Taylor as Osman, Troy Glasgow as Troy, Adam Sinclair as Ashdown, Lizzie Hopley as Hilda and Julia Joyce as Imogen.

It was produced by Michael Preger, Stephen Smallwood and directed by Nick Copus (EastEnders, The 4400). The script was by Patrick Harbinson, who has also written episodes of the British dramas Soldier Soldier and Heartbeat, and the American series ER and Law & Order.

Filming locations
Cobstone Windmill at Ibstone, Buckinghamshire appears briefly as Masen approaches the village where he meets Susan and Imogen.

Masen then descends Cobstone Hill into Turville where the scenes in which he meets Susan and Imogen were filmed. The two girls are seen living at the Bull & Butcher, the public house of the same name in Turville.

Shirning, the house used by Bill Masen's father, is Groombridge Place near Tunbridge Wells in Kent. This location was earlier used in the 2005 production of Pride and Prejudice.

The scenes based in a religious community were filmed at the Hospital of St Cross in Winchester.

The pub which Coker and his team take over is The Cockpit which is on St Andrew's Hill in the St Pauls area of London.

Home media
The series was released on DVD on 1 February 2010 in the United Kingdom. The Blu-ray Disc release followed on 22 February. It was shown in Canada on Showcase in February 2011 and subsequently released on DVD.

References

External links
 
 Web site for the 2009 TV series
 

BBC television dramas
2000s British television miniseries
Television shows based on British novels
British science fiction television shows
2009 British television series debuts
2009 British television series endings
2000s British science fiction television series
British horror fiction television series
2000s British horror television series